Suren Yurievich Arakelov (born October 16, 1947 in Kharkiv) is a Soviet mathematician of Armenian descent known for developing Arakelov theory.

Biography 
From 1965 onwards Arakelov attended the Mathematics department of Moscow State University, where he graduated in 1971.

In 1974, Arakelov received his candidate of sciences degree from the Steklov Institute in Moscow, under the supervision of Igor Shafarevich. He then worked as a junior researcher at the Gubkin Russian State University of Oil and Gas in Moscow until 1979. He did protest against arrest of Alexander Solzhenitsyn, and was arrested and committed to a mental hospital. Then he stopped his research activity to pursue other life goals. As of 2014 he lives in Moscow with his wife and children.

Arakelov theory 

Arakelov theory was exploited  by Paul Vojta to give a new proof of the Mordell conjecture and by Gerd Faltings in his proof of Lang's generalization of the Mordell conjecture.

Publications

References

External links
 

1947 births
20th-century Ukrainian mathematicians
Living people
Scientists from Kharkiv
Soviet mathematicians
Arithmetic geometers
Moscow State University alumni